CFEI-FM (106.5 MHz) is a French-language Canadian radio station located in Saint-Hyacinthe, Quebec, serving the eastern suburbs of Montréal. Owned and operated by Bell Media, it broadcasts with an effective radiated power (ERP) of 3,000 watts (class A) using an omnidirectional antenna.

The station has an oldies format since May 2003 (it previously had an adult contemporary format) and is part of the "Boom" network.

History
CFEI-FM signed on the air on March 30, 1988. It was a sister station to CKBS 1240 AM, also in Saint-Hyacinthe.  The AM station went dark only three years later, leading some observers to believe that the application for a new FM station really was a plan to transfer CKBS to FM by disguised means.  At the time AM-to-FM transfers were still uncommon in Canada as such applications were then, unlike now, generally rejected by the CRTC.

References

External links
Boom 106,5
Decision CRTC 87-57
 

Fei
Fei
Fei
Fei
Saint-Hyacinthe
Radio stations established in 1988
1988 establishments in Quebec